At Mount Zoomer, the second full length LP from the Canadian indie rock band Wolf Parade, was released on June 17, 2008.

Album title
The album is named after Wolf Parade drummer Arlen Thompson's sound studio, Mount Zoomer; the name of the studio references "a B.C. euphemism for magic mushrooms", and also nods to the Montreal band A Silver Mount Zion. The album was originally meant to be entitled Kissing the Beehive; however, due to possible copyright infringements in relation to Jonathan Carroll's 1997 novel of the same name, this title was changed. Singer and keyboardist Spencer Krug said that the band "didn't know that was the title of a book... We might have to change it, but we might not. And we'll have to make it clear that it's not [named] after his book. It's a complicated situation." It had also been reported earlier by Blender that the record was entitled Pardon My Blues; however, on April 28, Sub Pop officially announced that the album's name would be At Mount Zoomer.

Album overview
The band started playing new songs live that would end up on At Mount Zoomer as early as summer 2007. Among the first to be played were "Language City" and "Fine Young Cannibals".

According to singer and guitarist Dan Boeckner, half of the album was recorded in Farnham, Quebec at Petite Église, an old church that was converted to a recording studio by the band Arcade Fire for the production of their album Neon Bible. After touring the east coast in late 2007, Wolf Parade recorded the rest of At Mount Zoomer at MIXart Studios in Montreal, Quebec. Afterwards, the album was mixed at Arlen Thompson's sound studio, Mount Zoomer.

The cover art for the album features the work of Matt Moroz and Elizabeth Huey, depicting a battle scene between the two artists.

The track "Call It a Ritual" was released by the band on April 14, 2008.

Reception

At Mount Zoomer received positive reviews from critics. On Metacritic, the album holds a score of 78 out of 100 based on 28 reviews, indicating "generally favorable reviews".

Track listing

Personnel
 Wolf Parade – mixing, producing, "overdubs and vocals recorded by"
 Harris Newman – mastering
 Arlen Thompson – recording (tracks 1, 2, 4, 6-8), "one vocal recorded by"
 David Ferry – recording (tracks 3, 5, 9)
 Nick Petrowski – recording (tracks 3, 5, 9)
 David Smith – "some vocals recorded by"
 Jace Lasek – "some vocals recorded by"
 Elizabeth Huey – artwork
 Matt Moroz – artwork

References

2008 albums
Wolf Parade albums
Sub Pop albums